American football was introduced to the United Kingdom during the early part of the 20th century by American servicemen stationed in the country. The first recorded match took place on 23 November 1910 at Crystal Palace, London, where a team made up of the crew from USS Idaho defeated their counterparts from USS Vermont 19–0. During the Second World War, matches were played by American and Canadian servicemen stationed in the UK at venues throughout the country. This included the 'Tea Bowl' game played at the White City Stadium in 1944, and this was followed by the creation of the United States Armed Forces Europe (USAFE) league in 1946. This league consisted of teams from American military bases throughout Europe, with one of the league's three conferences made up of teams based in the UK – teams from this conference won the league championship thirteen times until the competition ceased in 1993.

The first teams open to British players were established in 1983, and competition began the following year in the form of a series of one-off games. The match results were compiled into a 'Merit Table', with teams playing more than three games eligible for the championship—the first champions were the London Ravens, who won all ten of their matches. Hundreds of clubs have since been formed, playing both full contact football and flag football at senior, university and youth level. Many of these clubs have since folded, renamed or merged with other local teams, but a few of the older clubs survive today.

The sport is administered by the British American Football Association (BAFA), with two main bodies of competition; the BAFA National Leagues (BAFANL) and the British Universities American Football League (operating as part of the British Universities and Colleges Sport competition).

National Football League
As part of the NFL International Series, the National Football League, which otherwise has all of its teams resident in the United States, has one team with a permanent part-time residence in the UK.

The league also plays neutral-site games in London under the International Series banner. Since 2007, these have all been at Wembley Stadium; in 2019, the neutral-site games moved to the new home of Tottenham Hotspur.

BAFA National Leagues
The BAFA National Leagues (BAFANL) was formed in 2010 by the BAFA in response to the British American Football League's decision to split from the governing body.

The senior league's membership comprises 68 teams based in towns ranging from Newquay in the south of England to Aberdeen in Scotland. The league is split into two regional conferences; the Southern Football Conference (SFC) and the Northern Football Conference (NFC). The teams within each conference are spread across three tiers with promotion and relegation between each level. The bottom two tiers are further divided into regional conferences. The top-ranking teams in each division compete in playoffs culminating in divisional finals—the championship game contested by the top Premier Division teams is known as the BritBowl. The 2017 champions are the Tamworth Phoenix, who defeated the London Blitz 34–28 in the final held at the Sixways Stadium.

In addition to adult contact football, the BAFA runs youth, junior and women's contact football, and also flag football across all age ranges. A number of the teams within the league operate teams across two or more of these competitions. The British American Football Association defines the age ranges used within the league as follows:

Northern Ireland
Northern Irish teams compete in an amateur island-wide regional competition in Ireland, organised by the Irish American Football League (IAFL). Teams from Northern Ireland compete in the Northern Division of the IAFL. The teams, along with other amateur teams in Northern Ireland and throughout the rest of Ireland, also compete in competitions such as the Shamrock Bowl.

Currently neither of the two universities of Northern Ireland compete in either the British Universities or the IAFL College Bowl.

British Universities and Colleges Sport

The British Universities American Football League (BUAFL) was formed in 2007 by the BAFA after the organisation that ran its predecessor ceased operations. Since 2012, the league has operated under the jurisdiction of British Universities and Colleges Sport (BUCS).

The league operates on three tiers – two Premier divisions (North and South) with 6 regional conferences in the lower two tiers – with most teams from the two Premier divisions competing in postseason Championship playoffs. A system of promotion and relegation is used between the three tiers. The two teams that progress through the playoffs compete in the National Championship Final (formerly the College Bowl) which is held at the South Leeds Stadium.

The 2016-17 champions are the Stirling Clansmen, who defeated the Durham Saints 10–7 in the final played at the Sixways Stadium, Worcester.

Exhibition Teams
The following teams are Exhibition teams who play several annual games on the continent against a European League team. The team is made up of a selection of BAFANL players from other sides.

British Armed Forces Teams

8GL League
The 8GL League is an 8 vs 8 Adult contact League, initially set up as a separate entity not under the governing body of the British American Football Association.

American High School League in Europe
The American High School League in Europe (also referred to as High School Football Europe) is a competition organised by the European branch of the Department of Defense Dependents Schools. The teams in this league are drawn from high schools affiliated with US military bases within Europe, with the exception of South Gloucestershire and Stroud College which is a further education college located in Filton, England. The league in its present format was founded in 1975, with its constituent teams divided into three divisions. All teams play a regular season schedule against the other teams in their regional conference, with the top-ranked teams competing in playoffs to decide the divisional champions. As of 2017, only one team based in the United Kingdom competes in the league, compared to the five teams that competed in 2012.

Bristol Academy Community League
The Bristol Academy Community League (BACL) is a competition set up by the Bristol Academy of Sport in December 2012 for school pupils in Bristol and its surrounding areas. The league provides competition for players in the 14-17 and 17-20-year age brackets. The league comprises six teams, representing a specific geographic area.

References

External links
 British American Football Association
 BAFA National Leagues
 American Football at British Universities & Colleges Sport
 High School Football Europe

 
Amer
American football-related lists